The Bravos de Margarita (Margarita Braves) are a professional baseball team who plays in the Venezuelan Professional Baseball League since the 2007-08 season.

The team was founded in 1991 as the Petroleros de Cabimas (Cabimas Oilers), and played through the 1994-95 season. Later was renamed as Pastora de Occidente (Shepherds of the West) from 1995-96 to 1996-97, being also known as Pastora de los Llanos (Shepherds of the Plains) from 1997-98 to 2006-07.

Since their inception, the Bravos de Margarita have played at Estadio Nueva Esparta, which is located in Margarita Island.

Current roster

Team's Yearly Record
14 seasons total

2007-2015 Playoff Format

2015-2019 Playoff Format

2020- Playoff Format

References

External links
Official site

Baseball teams in Venezuela
Baseball teams established in 2007
2007 establishments in Venezuela
Margarita Island